is the 11th major single (15th counting the indies) by the Japanese girl idol group S/mileage, released in Japan on August 22, 2012.

Background 
The single was released in four versions: Limited Edition A, Limited Edition B, Limited Edition C, Limited Edition D, and Regular Edition. Each edition has a different cover. The limited editions A, B, and C include a bonus DVD with a different version of the music video for the title track. All the limited editions are shipped sealed and include a serial-numbered entry card for the lottery to win a ticket to one of the single's launch events.

The B-side is a cover of the hit song "Kimi wa Jitensha Watashi wa Densha de Kitaku" by Cute. Cute released it as a CD single four months prior, in April 2012. The version by S/mileage is used as a theme song in Kaidan Shin Mimibukuro Igyō, a movie starring S/mileage members that came out on August 11.

Track listing

Bonus 
Sealed into all the limited editions
 Event ticket lottery card with a serial number

Charts

DVD single 
The corresponding DVD single (so called Single V) was released a week later, on August 29.

Track listing

References

External links 
  - Hello! Project
  - Up-Front Works
 
 
 Tsunku's comments about the single

2012 singles
Japanese-language songs
Angerme songs
Songs written by Tsunku
Song recordings produced by Tsunku
2012 songs